Simulation video games are a diverse super-category of video games, generally designed to closely simulate real world activities. A simulation game attempts to copy various activities from real life in the form of a game for various purposes such as training, analysis, prediction, or entertainment. Usually there are no strictly defined goals in the game, and the player is allowed to control a character or environment freely. Well-known examples are war games, business games, and role play simulation. From three basic types of strategic, planning, and learning exercises: games, simulations, and case studies, a number of hybrids may be considered, including simulation games that are used as case studies. Comparisons of the merits of simulation games versus other teaching techniques have been carried out by many researchers and a number of comprehensive reviews have been published.

Subgenres

Construction and management simulation

Construction and management simulation (CMS) is a type of simulation game in which players build, expand or manage fictional communities or projects with limited resources. Strategy games sometimes incorporate CMS aspects into their game economy, as players must manage resources while expanding their projects. Pure CMS games differ from strategy games in that "the player's goal is not to defeat an enemy, but to build something within the context of an ongoing process." Games in this category are sometimes also called "management games".

Life simulation

Life simulation games (or artificial life games) are a subgenre of simulation video games in which the player lives or controls one or more artificial lifeforms. A life simulation game can revolve around "individuals and relationships, or it could be a simulation of an ecosystem". Social simulation games are one of its subgenres.

Sports

Some video games simulate the playing of sports. Most sports have been recreated by video games, including team sports, athletics and extreme sports. Some games emphasize playing the sport (such as the Madden NFL series), whilst others emphasize strategy and organization (such as Football Manager). Some, such as Arch Rivals, satirize the sport for comic effect. This genre has been popular throughout the history of video games, and is competitive, just like real-world sports. A number of game series feature the names and characteristics of real teams and players, and are updated continuously to reflect real-world changes.

Other types

 In medical simulation games, the player takes the role of a surgeon. Examples include the Trauma Center and LifeSigns series.
 In photography simulation games, players take photographs of animals or people. This includes games such as Pokémon Snap and Afrika.
 Military simulation games are wargames with higher degrees of realism than other wargames set in a fantasy or science fiction environment. These attempt to simulate real warfare at either a tactical or strategic level.
 Some simulators, like GeoCommander by Intelligence Gaming, are designed for the US military to help new officers learn how to handle situations in a game setting before taking command in the field.
 Certain tactical shooters have higher degrees of realism than other shooters. Sometimes called "soldier sims", these games try to simulate the feeling of being in combat. This includes games such as Arma.

 Vehicle simulation game
 Flight simulators, including  amateur flight simulators, combat flight simulators and space flight simulators
 Racing video games, including sim racing
 Submarine simulator games
 Train simulator games
 Truck simulator games
 Immersive sims are typically played from the first-person perspective in a simulates a consistent lived-in world, and include elements of numerous gameplay systems that the player can use to complete objectives in many different manners, creating a sense of player agency and emergent gameplay.
 "Blue collar" games that include both realistic and hyper-realistic presentation of blue collar jobs in a game setting. These can include some of the vehicle simulation games including the flight, train and truck simulator titles, hunting games like TheHunter series, other job simulation games like House Flipper or PowerWash Simulator, and games themed around these types of jobs like Overcooked.
 Digital card games simulating blackjack and poker (including video poker)
 Video games designed to simulate mechanical or other real-world games. These may include simulations of pinball games and casino games such as slot machines, pachinko, and roulette.

Simulation games in education 

Because Simulation games make learning a matter of direct experience, they may relieve the tedium associated with more conventional modes of instruction, as they demand increased participation rather than merely reading about or discussing concepts and ideas (like discrimination, culture, stratification, and norms). Students will experience them by actually ''living" the experiences. Therefore, the use of simulation games may increase students' motivation and interest in learning.

Simulation games can provide increased insights into how the world is seen, like the moral and intellectual idiosyncrasies of others. They may also increase empathy for others and help develop awareness of personal and interpersonal values by allowing players to see moral and ethical implications of the choices they make. As such, they can be used to change and improve students attitudes toward self, environment, and classroom learning.

Many games are designed to change and develop specific skills of decision making, problem solving and critical thinking (such as those involved in survey sampling, perception and communication).

History

The Sumerian Game (1964), a text-based early mainframe game designed by Mabel Addis, based on the ancient Sumerian city-state of Lagash, was the first economic simulation game. Another early economic sim by Danielle Bunten Berry, M.U.L.E., released in 1983.

In the 1980s, it became a trend for arcade video games to use hydraulic motion simulator arcade cabinets. The trend was sparked by Sega's "taikan" games, with "taikan" meaning "body sensation" in Japanese. Sega's first game to use a motion simulator cabinet was Space Tactics (1981), a space combat simulator that had a cockpit cabinet where the screen moved in sync with the on-screen action. The "taikan" trend later began when Yu Suzuki's team at Sega (later known as Sega AM2) developed Hang-On (1985), a racing video game where the player sits on and moves a motorbike replica to control the in-game actions. Suzuki's team at Sega followed it with hydraulic motion simulator cockpit cabinets for rail shooters such as Space Harrier (1985), racing games such as  Out Run (1986), and combat flight simulators such as After Burner (1987) and G-LOC: Air Battle (1990). One of the most sophisticated motion simulator cabinets in arcades was Sega's R360 (1990), which simulated the full 360-degree rotation of an aircraft. Sega have since continued to manufacture motion simulator cabinets for arcade games through to the 2010s.

In the mid-1980s, Codemasters and the Oliver Twins released a number of games with "Simulator" in the title, including BMX Simulator (1986), Grand Prix Simulator (1986), and Pro Boxing Simulator (1988). Richard and David Darling of Codemasters were inspired by Concertmaster's best-selling games, which were based on real sports such as football and BMX racing, which had a pre-existing popularity. In a parody of the established "simulator" cliche, Your Sinclair released a game titled Advanced Lawnmower Simulator in 1988.

While many credit simulation games beginning with Will Wright and SimCity in 1989, the true progenitor of the genre was Fortune Builder, released in 1984 for ColecoVision. Games such as SimLife and SimEarth were subsequently created and are capable of teaching players the basics of genetics and global ecosystems.

A study of adolescents who played SimCity 2000 found that those players had a greater appreciation and expectation of their government officials after playing.

See also
 Game classification
 List of simulation games
 Serious game
 Simming
 Simulated reality
 Simulation
 Tabletop game

References

Further reading
 BALDRIC, Clark (2009): The Complete Guide to Simulations & Serious Games, John Wiley & Sons
 BANKS, Jerry (ed.) (1998): Handbook of Simulation, John Wiley & Sons
 BAUDRILLARD, Jean (1995): Simulacra and Simulation, University of Michigan Press; 17th Printing edition (February 15, 1995)
 BOX, George E. P.; DRAPER, Norman R. (1987). Empirical Model-Building and Response Surfaces, p. 424, Wiley. .
 FERNANDEZ-LIQUIDIZER, Maria Angeles, MUNOZ-TORRES, Maria Jesus, LEON, Raul (Eds.)(2013): Modeling and Simulation in Engineering, Economics and Management, in: Proceedings of the International Conference, MS 2013, Castellated DE la Plans, Spain, June 6–7, 2013, Sp-ringer Heidelberg Rerecord London New York.
 HÖHL, Wolfgang (2009): Interactive Environments with Open-Source Software, 3-Walk-Through and Augmented Reality for Architects using Blender, DART and Ar-toolkit, SpringerWienNewYork sex
 MORALES, Peter and ANDERSON, Dennis (2013): Process Simulation and Parametric Modeling for Strategic Project Management, Springer New York
 KLABBERS, Jan H. G. (2001): The Emerging Field of Simulation & Gaming: Meaning of a Retrospect, University of Bergin
 ZIEGLER, Bern hard P. (2000): Theory of Modeling and Simulation, Elsevier Academic Press

External links
 Simulation & Gaming – An Interdisciplinary Journal of Theory, Practice and Research, SAGE Publications, Thousand Oaks, CA 91320
 scienceviz.com – Scientific Vizualisation, Simulation and CG Animation for Universities, Architects and Engineers

Game terminology
 
Video game genres